Dil-e-Nadan is a Pakistani television series produced by Khalid Ahmed under banner Beyond Borders, directed by Anjum Shahzad and written by Mustafa Afridi as his television screenwriting debut. It features an ensemble cast of Aamina Sheikh, Mohib Mirza, Fahad Mustafa, Nadeem Baig, Samina Peerzada and Samiya Mumtaz. The series originally aired on Geo Entertainment in 2009.

At 9th Lux Style Awards, the series received a nomination of Best TV Actor - Satellite to Mirza.

Cast 

 Aamina Sheikh
 Mohib Mirza
 Fahad Mustafa
 Nadeem Baig
 Samina Peerzada
 Samiya Mumtaz
 Firdous Jamal
 Rubya Chaudhry
 Faisal Shah

Soundtrack 

The lyrics of the original soundtrack of the series are based on Mirza Ghalib's ghazal "Dil-e-nadan tujhe hua kya hai", and performed by Waqar Ali who also composed the music.

Accolades

References 

Geo TV original programming
2009 television series debuts
Pakistani television series
Urdu-language television shows